Mount Frishman is a small, pointed mountain,  high, in the eastern part of the Robinson Heights, in the Admiralty Mountains of Victoria Land, Antarctica. The topographical feature was first mapped by the United States Geological Survey from surveys and U.S. Navy photography, 1960–63, and was named by the Advisory Committee on Antarctic Names for Steven A. Frishman, a United States Antarctic Research Program biologist at Hallett Station, 1966–67. The mountain lies situated on the Pennell Coast, a portion of Antarctica lying between Cape Williams and Cape Adare.

References 

Mountains of Victoria Land
Pennell Coast